Ran Kadoch (or Ran Kadosh, ; born 4 October 1985) is an Israeli professional footballer who plays as a goalkeeper for Bnei Yehuda.

Career
Kadoch has played for clubs in all top three leagues (Ligat Haal, Liga Leumit, Liga Artzit which is now called Liga Alef) in his native Israel.
Prior to his professional career he won several championships in the Israeli youth leagues with Ironi Rishon Le Zion and also won The high schools championship being the captain of the team at Makif Chet international school.
In his first years as pro (season 2003–04) he started playing for Ironi Rishon Le Zion in Liga Leumit (2nd division) at the age of 17 penned a 5 years contract. On his 3rd year at that club he became 1st choice goalkeeper.
After 3 years (season 2006–07) he moved on loan to Hapoel Raanana (Liga Leumit) for 6 months and then to Bney Lod (Liga Leumit) for another 6 months.
The next year (season 2007–08) he started on loan again at Hakoach Ramat Gan (Liga Leumit) and then moved after 2 months to Sekzia Nes Ziona (Liga Artzit).
Kadoch holds a French passport, allowing him to play in Europe without counting against the foreign player limit.
The next year (season 2008–09) After a trial at Oldham Athletic (English league one) he signed eventually with Barnet F.C (English league two) in August 2008. Kadoch made the unusual choice of the number 55 squad number at Barnet, the number 5 being considered lucky in Judaism. However, The Football League does not allow squad numbers over 50 so this was changed to 25. Kadoch made his debut appearance for Barnet in the Football League Trophy where Barnet lost to Dagenham & Redbridge 4–2. He played 12 league games for the Bees before being released at the end of the season.
The next year (season 2009–10) on 5 July 2009 Kadoch penned a one-year deal with Bnei Yehuda (Israeli Ligat Haal). Later on that season he extended his contract by 3 more years being promised to become the future goalkeeper of the team. In the end of the season Kadoch played an unforgettable game in which he stopped Maccabi Haifa's strikers repeatedly and destroyed their championship celebrations by forcing a 1–1 draw as the man of the match and giving Hapoel Tel Aviv the opportunity to win the title. 
After a couple of years with Bnei Yehuda, (season 2011–12) in July 2011 Kadoch moved on loan for one year to Hapoel Haifa (Ligat Haal).
In the next year (season 2012–13) he moved on loan for 6 months to Asi Gilboa (Liga Alef Tzafon) and then in January he moved, this time to Sekzia Nes Ziona (Liga Leumit).
The next year (season 2013–14) he started with Maccabi Kiryat Malaachi (Liga Alef Darom) and after 4 months he moved to Beitar Kfar Saba (Liga Alef Darom) in which he got to the playoffs final and with an impressive statistics of 19 clean sheets in 32 games.
The next year (2014–15) he signed a one-year deal with Bnei Sakhnin (Ligat Haal) finishing the season in the top of the bottom playoff and having his career breakthrough he extended his contract for two more years as the team's 1st choice Keeper. The next season he moved to Hapoel Kfar Saba in ligat haal for a one-year contract.

Personal life
Kadoch holds a French passport.

Statistics

Honours

Hapoel Haifa
Israel State Cup (1): 2017–18

References

External links

Profile at Soccerway

1985 births
Living people
Israeli Jews
Association football goalkeepers
Israeli footballers
Hapoel Rishon LeZion F.C. players
Hapoel Ra'anana A.F.C. players
Hapoel Bnei Lod F.C. players
Hakoah Maccabi Amidar Ramat Gan F.C. players
Sektzia Ness Ziona F.C. players
Barnet F.C. players
Bnei Yehuda Tel Aviv F.C. players
Hapoel Haifa F.C. players
Hapoel Asi Gilboa F.C. players
Maccabi Kiryat Malakhi F.C. players
Beitar Kfar Saba F.C. players
Bnei Sakhnin F.C. players
Hapoel Kfar Saba F.C. players
Israeli expatriate footballers
Expatriate footballers in England
Israeli expatriate sportspeople in England
Footballers from Ma'ale Adumim
Israeli settlers
Israeli Premier League players
Liga Leumit players
English Football League players
Israeli people of French-Jewish descent